Anyone for Mozart, Bach, Handel, Vivaldi? is a CD compilation re-issue of music by the Swingle Singers.  It combines tracks from two previous LP releases, Going Baroque (tracks 6 – 16) and Swinging Mozart (aka Anyone for Mozart?) (tracks 1 – 5).

Track listing 
 "Piano Sonata No. 15 in C major" ("Sonata semplice") K. 545 (W. A. Mozart) – 6:19
 "Allegro"
 "Andante"
 "Allegretto"
 "Variations (12) on 'Ah, vous dirai-je maman' for piano in C major" K. 265 (K. 300e) (Mozart) – 5:51
 "Piano Sonata No. 13 in B flat major" K. 333 (K. 315c) ~ Allegro (Mozart) – 2:51
 "Sonata for violin & piano No. 29 in A major" (fragment), K. 402 (K. 385) (Mozart) – 2:52
 "Serenade No. 13 for strings in G major" ("Eine kleine Nachtmusik") K. 525 (Mozart) – 10:16
 "Allegro"
 "Romance"
 "Menuetto"
 "Rondo"
 "Badinerie" from Orchestral Suite No. 2 in B minor, BWV 1067 (J.S. Bach) – 1:21
 "Air" from Suite for keyboard (Suite de piece), Vol.1, No.5 in E major (G.F. Händel) – 2:25
 "Gigue" from Suite for solo cello No. 3 in C major, BWV 1009 (J.S. Bach) – 1:21
 "Largo" from Concerto for harpsichord, strings & continuo No. 5 in F minor, BWV 1056 (J.S. Bach) – 3:02
 "Prelude" Prelude and Fugue, for keyboard No. 19 in A major BWV 864 (BC L98) (J.S. Bach) – 1:11
 "Praeambule" Partita for keyboard No. 5 in G major, BWV 829 (BC L5) (J.S. Bach) – 2:27
 "Fugue" from Concerto for 2 violins, cello, strings & continuo in D minor ("L'estro armonico" No. 11), Op. 3/11, RV 565 (Vivaldi) – 2:24
 "Prelude" from Prelude and Fugue, for keyboard No. 7 in E flat major BWV 876 (BC L110) (J.S. Bach) – 2:42
 "Solfeggio, for piano in C minor," H. 220, Wq. 117/2 (C.P.E. Bach) – 0:57
 "Frühling" (Spring) (W.F. Bach) – 1:35
 "Prelude" from Prelude and Fugue, for keyboard No. 24 in B minor" BWV 893 (BC L127) (J.S. Bach) – 1:56

Personnel 
Vocals:
 Jeanette Baucomont – soprano
 Christiane Legrand – soprano
 Anne Germain – alto
 Alice Herald – alto (tracks 1 - 5)
 Claudine Meunier – alto (tracks 6 - 16)
 Ward Swingle – tenor, arranger
 Claude Germain – tenor
 Jean Cussac – baritone
 José Germain – bass (tracks 1 - 5)
 Jean Claude Briodin – bass (tracks 6 - 16)
Rhythm section:
 Guy Pedersen – double bass
 Daniel Humair – drums (tracks 1 - 5)
 Gus Wallez  – percussion (tracks 6 - 16)

References 

The Swingle Singers albums
1986 compilation albums
Philips Records albums